Events from the year 1963 in Iran.

Incumbents
 Shah: Mohammad Reza Pahlavi 
 Prime Minister: Asadollah Alam

Events
January 26 – 1963 Iranian constitutional referendum
June 5 and 6 – June 5, 1963, demonstrations in Iran
September 17 – 1963 Iranian legislative election

Births
 24 November – Kayhan Kalhor.

See also
 Years in Iraq
 Years in Afghanistan

References

 
Iran
Years of the 20th century in Iran
1960s in Iran
Iran